Robert Cooke may refer to:

Politicians
Robert Cooke (Conservative politician) (1930–1987), British Conservative Party politician
Robert Cooke (Parliamentarian) (1598–1643), English politician who sat in the House of Commons between 1640 and 1643

Others
Robert Cooke (officer of arms) (died 1593), herald, Clarenceux King of Arms under Elizabeth I of England
Robert Cooke (organist) (1768–1814), English organist
Robert Cooke (physician) (1880–1960), American researcher into allergies
Bob Cooke (cricketer) (born 1943), former English cricketer
Robert Cooke (cricketer) (1900–1957), English cricketer
Robbie Cooke (1957–2021), English footballer

See also
Bert Cooke (disambiguation)
Robert Cook (disambiguation)
Robert Coke (disambiguation)
Cooke (surname)